James McMillan is a British jazz trumpeter, record producer and the founder and owner of the record label, Quietmoney Recordings. He performed on and produced Liane Carroll's albums  Up and Down, Ballads and The Right To Love, all of which were released on his Quietmoney label, and also her 2015 album Seaside.

He was the conductor for the  entry in the 1998 Eurovision Song Contest.

References

External links
 Official website
Discography at Discogs

British record producers
British jazz trumpeters
Male trumpeters
Eurovision Song Contest conductors
British male jazz musicians